The year 1022 (MXXII) was a common year starting on Monday (link will display the full calendar) of the Julian calendar.

Events 
 By place 
 Byzantine Empire 
 Spring – Battle of Svindax: The Byzantine army under Emperor Basil II defeats the Georgians at Svindax (modern Turkey). King George I is forced to negotiate a peace treaty, ending the Byzantine–Georgian wars.
 Summer – Nikephoros Phokas Barytrachelos conspires with the Byzantine general Nikephoros Xiphias against Basil II. The rebellion collapses and Xiphias assassinates Phokas.

 Europe 
 Spring – Emperor Henry II divides his army into three columns and descends through Rome onto Capua. The bulk of the expeditionary force (20,000 men) led by Henry, makes its way down the Adriatic coast.
 Pilgrim, archbishop of Cologne, marches with his army down the Tyrrhenian coast to lay siege to Capua. The citizens open the gates and surrender the city to the imperial army.
 Pilgrim besieges the city of Salerno for forty days. Prince Guaimar III offers to give hostages – Pilgrim accepts the prince's son and co-prince Guaimar IV, and lifts the siege.
 Summer – Outbreak of the plague among the German troops forces Henry II to abandon his campaign in Italy. He reimposes his suzerainty on the Lombard principalities. 
 King Olof Skötkonung dies and is succeeded by his son Anund Jakob as ruler of Sweden. He becomes the second Christian king of the Swedish realm.

 Africa 
 The 14-year-old Al-Mu'izz ibn Badis, with support of the Zirid nobles, takes over the government and (as a minor) ascends to the throne in Ifriqiya (modern Tunisia).

 Asia 
 The Chinese military has one million registered soldiers during the Song Dynasty, an increase since the turn of the 11th century (approximate date).

 By topic 
 Religion 
 After the Council of Orléans, King Robert II of France burns thirteen heretics at Orléans. These are the first burning victims for heresy.
 Pope Benedict VIII convenes a synod at Pavia. He issues decrees to restrain simony and incontinence of the clergy.
 Æthelnoth, archbishop of Canterbury, travels to Rome to obtain the pallium. He is received by Benedict VIII.

Births 
 Fujiwara no Nobunaga, Japanese nobleman (d. 1094)
 Harold II, king of England (approximate date)
 Manasses III, French nobleman (d. 1065)
 Michael Attaleiates, Byzantine historian (d. 1080)
 Ordulf, duke of Saxony (approximate date)
 Rajaraja Narendra, Indian ruler (d. 1061)

Deaths 
 March 12 – Symeon the New Theologian, Byzantine monk (b. 949)
 March 23 – Zhen Zong, emperor of the Song Dynasty (b. 968)
 March 30 – Atenulf, Italian nobleman and Benedictine abbot
 June 28 – Notker III, German Benedictine monk and writer
 July 23 – Lei Yungong, Chinese palace eunuch and adviser
 August 15 – Nikephoros Phokas, Byzantine aristocrat
 September 2 – Máel Sechnaill II, High King of Ireland
 November 20 – Bernward, bishop of Hildesheim 
 December 2 – Elvira Menéndez, queen of León 
 Al-Shaykh Al-Mufid, Twelver Shia theologian 
 Arikesarin, Indian ruler of the Shilahara Dynasty
 Aziz al-Dawla, Fatimid governor of Aleppo
 Konstantin Dobrynich, mayor of Novgorod
 Moninho Viegas, French knight (b. 950)
 Olof Skötkonung, king of Sweden 
 Rededya, leader of the Kassogians
 Sidi Mahrez, Tunisian scholar (b. 951)

References